A referendum on the Turnhalle plan was held in South West Africa on 18 May 1977. In the Whites-only referendum, the draft constitution was approved by 94.69% of voters. However, following pressure from the United Nations Security Council, the constitution was never enacted.

Results

References

1977 referendums
Referendums in Namibia
1977 in South West Africa